The Benomi Case House is a historic house at 436 Rainbow Road in Windsor, Connecticut.  Built in 1834, it is one of the town's finest examples of Greek Revival architecture in brick.  It was listed on the National Register of Historic Places in 1988.

Description and history
The Benomi Case House is located in what is now a suburban residential area of northwestern Windsor, on the north side of Rainbow Road between East Granby and Hamilton Roads. It faces roughly east, and is five bays wide and four deep, with two end chimneys on each side. The main facade has a center entrance with sidelights and a transom window above. The side gables, framed in wood, are fully pedimented, and have rectangular windows with tracery at their centers. A single-story ell with garage extends to the north. The property also includes a 19th-century shed.

The house was built in 1834 by Benomi Case, a farmer.  After Case's son Otis died in 1888, the house was purchased by Manley Snow, in whose family it remained for nearly 100 years.  The house is a simple and elegant example of the Greek Revival.

See also
National Register of Historic Places listings in Windsor, Connecticut

References

Houses on the National Register of Historic Places in Connecticut
National Register of Historic Places in Hartford County, Connecticut
Greek Revival architecture in Connecticut
Houses completed in 1834
Houses in Windsor, Connecticut